Khristo Khristov may refer to:

Khristo Khristov (fencer) (born 1951), Bulgarian Olympic fencer
Khristo Khristov (pole vaulter) (1935–2015), Bulgarian Olympic pole vaulter
Khristo Khristov (sprinter), winner at the 1998 Balkan Athletics Championships
Khristo Yankov Khristov, Bulgarian physicist
Khristo Angelov Khristov, Bulgarian historian

See also
Christo Christov, Bulgarian film director
Hristo Hristov, Bulgarian weightlifter